"All Over the World" is a 2010 single by Swedish singer Ola, full name Ola Svensson and the third single from his 2010 self-titled album Ola after his two Swedish hits from the album: Unstoppable (The Return of Natalie)" and "Overdrive". The third release peaked at number three on the Swedish Singles Chart.

Charts

References

2010 singles
Ola Svensson songs
2010 songs
Songs written by Tony Nilsson
Songs written by Ola Svensson